Artel Electronics  is a company from Uzbekistan that manufactures consumer electronics. The company's headquarters are in Tashkent, Uzbekistan.

History
In 2011, the company established its first factory in Tashkent, producing gas stoves. The company released its first smartphone in 2012.

In 2021, the company was rated as "B" for its long-term issuer default rating, and was also rated "B" the following year.

References

Home appliance manufacturers
Consumer electronics